Vatileh (also Romanized as Vatīleh) is a village in Firuzjah Rural District, Bandpey-ye Sharqi District, Babol County, Mazandaran Province, Iran. At the 2006 census, its population was 232, in 56 families.

References 

Populated places in Babol County